Streptococcus bovis (S. bovis) is a species of Gram-positive bacteria that in humans is associated with urinary tract infections, endocarditis, sepsis,  and colorectal cancer. S. gallolyticus is commonly found in the alimentary tract of cattle, sheep, and other ruminants, and may cause ruminal acidosis or feedlot bloat. It is also associated with spontaneous bacterial peritonitis, a frequent complication occurring in patients affected by cirrhosis. Equivalence with Streptococcus equinus has been contested.

S. bovis group
The S. bovis group includes S. equinus, S. gallolyticus, S. infantarius, and other closely related species; they are the nonenterococcal group D streptococci. Members of this group are esculin positive, 6.5% salt negative, sorbitol negative and produce acetoin.  Isolates from the S. bovis group are most frequently encountered in blood cultures from patients with colon cancer. However, S. bovis group organisms (especially S. gallolyticus subsp. gallolyticus and S. infantarius subsp. coli) have been associated with endocarditis (3). Although infection with S. bovis group organisms occurs with higher frequency in adults than in pediatric patients, these organisms have been reported to cause neonatal sepsis and meningitis (20).

Classification 
S. bovis is a catalase-negative and oxidase-negative, nonmotile, non-sporulating, Gram-positive lactic acid bacterium that grows as pairs or chains of cocci.  It is a member of the Lancefield group D streptococci.  Most strains are gamma-hemolytic (non-hemolytic), but some also display alpha-hemolytic activity on sheep blood agar plates. Strep bovis is a non-enterococci.
Biochemical Tests
mannitol salt: negative
bile esculin: negative
MR/VP: positive/negative
nutrient gelatin: negative
starch: positive
DNase: negative

Human infection

Entry 
The main portal of entry for human infection of S. bovis bacteremia is the gastrointestinal tract, but in some cases, entry is through the urinary tract, the hepatobiliary tree, or the oropharynx.

Role in disease 
S. bovis is a human pathogen that has been implicated as a causative agent of endocarditis, urinary tract infections, and more rarely, sepsis and neonatal meningitis.

S. bovis has long been associated with colorectal cancer; however, not all genospecies are associated equally. A 2011 meta-analysis on the association between S. bovis biotypes and colonic adenomas/carcinomas revealed that patients with S. bovis biotype I infection had a strongly increased risk of having colorectal cancer (pooled odds ratio: 7.26; 95% confidence interval: 3.94–13.36), compared to S. bovis biotype II-infected patients. This analysis suggests S. bovis should no longer be regarded as a single bacterial entity in clinical practice. Only Streptococcus gallolyticus (S. bovis biotype I) infection has an unambiguous association with colonic adenomas/carcinomas (prevalence range: 33–71%) that markedly exceeds the prevalence of colonic (pre-)malignancies in the general population (10–25%). Nevertheless, research has not yet determined that S. gallolyticus is a causative agent of colorectal cancer, or if pre-existing cancer makes the lumen of the large intestine more hospitable to its outgrowth.

Ruminal effects 
When ruminants consume diets high in starch or sugar, these easily fermentable carbohydrates promote the proliferation of S. bovis in the rumen.  Because S. bovis is a lactic acid bacterium, fermentation of these carbohydrates to lactic acid can cause a dramatic decline in ruminal pH, and subsequent development of adverse conditions such as ruminal acidosis or feedlot bloat.

References

External links 
 
 

Streptococcaceae
Gram-positive bacteria
Infectious causes of cancer
Bacteria described in 1919